Paul Leyland is a British astronomer and number theorist who has studied integer factorization and primality testing.

He has contributed to the factorization of RSA-129, RSA-140, and RSA-155, as well as potential factorial primes as large as 400! + 1. He has also studied Cunningham numbers, Cullen numbers, Woodall numbers, etc., and numbers of the form , which are now called Leyland numbers.  He was involved with the NFSNet project to use distributed computing on the Internet from 2005 to 2008.

References

External links
Paul Leyland's home page
Tacande Observatory's home page

Living people
Year of birth missing (living people)
Number theorists
20th-century British mathematicians
21st-century British mathematicians